Helen Carroll and the Satisfiers were an American smooth harmony popular music singing group of the mid-20th century consisting of Carroll (a female singer) and the Satisfiers (three male singers, Bob Lange, Ted Hansen and Art Lambert)

Helen Carroll was the stage name of Helen Kress (né Fulk) (May 23, 1914, Bloomington, Indiana – February 21, 2011, Rye, New Hampshire) She began her singing career as a teenager on radio in Memphis, Tennessee. Carroll returned to Indiana and enrolled at the Indiana University for college, but left school in her senior year to pursue a career in broadcasting. She settled in New York with hopes of working on Broadway, making her debut in the chorus of the short lived Geoffrey O'Hara musical Rogues and Vagabonds in 1930. Her appearances on Broadway were sporadic, including the roles of Daphne in Arthur Schwartz's Virginia (1937), the Citizen of New Amsterdam in Knickerbocker Holiday (1938-1939), and a woman tourist in Key Largo (1939). She found regular employment performing after auditioning for a group called the Merry Macs. With the Merry Macs, she appeared on Fred Allen's show and in the movie Love Thy Neighbor. Carroll left the group when it relocated to California; she signed on with the Satisfiers only after the group promised to remain in New York. Carroll was married to guitarist Carl Kress; the couple had a son, Rick, who became a drummer, and went on to become a professor of harmony at Berklee College of Music.

Helen Carroll and the Satisfiers were regulars on Perry Como's Chesterfield Supper Club which ran from 1944 to 1949. (One of Chesterfield's long-term advertising taglines was "They Satisfy", and the Satisfiers were named on this basis.) With or without Carroll, the Satisfiers also backed Como on some recordings. Most of the group's recording on their own were made with trumpeter Russ Case's orchestra for instrumental accompaniment.

Helen Carroll and the Satisfiers' recording of "Old Buttermilk Sky" reached #7 on the Billboard top-selling retail records chart for November 23, 1946 (there was no unified Billboard Hot 100 chart yet, but the retail sales chart is sometimes (although not always) considered the nearest approximation). Billboard described the record as exhibiting "easy flowing melodies and rhythms" which "fall easy on the ears" making for a "bright and breezy" performance. This recording also appeared on Billboard'''s chart of songs most played on jukeboxes.

Helen Carroll and the Satisfiers performed the theme song for the Little Lulu theatrical animated shorts. The song was written by Buddy Kaye, Fred Wise, and Sidney Lippman for the series, of which 26 episodes were produced by Famous Studios for Paramount Pictures between 1943 and 1948.

Helen Carroll with an ad-hoc group called the Swantones backed Frank Sinatra on one 1950 single, "Life is So Peculiar".

Discography
Singles
"Connee Boswell" with the Satisfiers ("Who'll Lend Me A Rainbow" Decca 18689 and "When I Come Back Crying/You Can't Say I Didn't Try" Coral 60040) -1945
"Perry Como with the Satisfiers & Russ Case Orchestra ("Dig You Later" also titled "A Hubba-Hubba-Hubba") Victor 20-1750, October 1945
"(L'il Abner) Don't Marry That Girl!" / "The Boogie Woogie Barnyard" (with the Russ Case Orchestra) (Victor 20-1928, 1946)
"Let's Sail to Dreamland" / "Ole Buttermilk Sky" (with the Russ Case Orchestra) (Victor 20-1952, 1946)
"Who'd A Thunk It" / "(Why, Oh Why, Did I Ever Leave) Wyoming?" (with the Russ Case Orchestra) (Victor 20-2191, 1947)
"Smoke Dreams" / "Do You Love Me Just As Much As Ever?" (with the Russ Case Orchestra) (RCA Victor 20-2300, 1947)
"Love Is So Terrific (Ouch! Terrific Thing)" / "A Little Consideration" (with the Russ Case Orchestra) (RCA Victor 20-2672, 1948)
"Shauny O'Shea" / "Little Lulu" (with the Russ Case Orchestra) (Victor 20-2673, 1948)
"Big Brass Band from Brazil" / "The Secretary Song (Bidibi Bot Bot)" (with the Russ Case Orchestra) (Victor, 1948)
"Takin' Miss Mary to the Ball" / "Walk A Little, Talk A Little" (with the Russ Case Orchestra) (RCA Victor 20-2868, 1948)
"Raggedy Ann" / "Highway to Love" (Victor 20-2915, 1948)

Compilations
"Auld Lang Syne" (featuring Beryl Davis; with Russ Case & His Orchestra) on The Very Best of Beryl Davis (2012, Stardust Records)
"I'm Always Chasing Rainbows" (featuring Perry Como) on Adapting the Classics (2013, Sounds of Yesteryear)Perry Como At the Supper Club Perry Como At the Supper Club Part IIPerry Como At the Supper Club Part IIIJo Stafford at the Supper ClubJo Stafford at the Supper Club Part IIJo Stafford at the Supper Club Part IIICompilations (Helen Carroll with the Swantones)
"Life is So Peculiar" (featuring Frank Sinatra) on Frank Sinatra Sings Songs From the Movies'' (2003, Sony Music Distribution #70081)

References

Notes

Musical groups established in the 1940s
American vocal groups
RCA Victor artists